Leo Bagrow (1881 Saint Petersburg – 9 August 1957 The Hague), born Lev Solomonovich Bagrow, was a historian of cartography and the founder of the journal Imago Mundi.

Notes

References

External links
Guide to Leo Bagrow's collection of Siberian maps at Houghton Library, Harvard University

1881 births
1957 deaths
Geographers from the Russian Empire
Historians from the Russian Empire
Emigrants from the Russian Empire to the Netherlands
Writers from Saint Petersburg
Historians of cartography
20th-century geographers